Antje Deusel (born 1960 in Nuremberg) is the first German-born woman to be ordained as a rabbi in Germany since the Nazi era. She was ordained in 2011 by Abraham Geiger College, and as of 2013 has a part-time position at Or Chaim.

Publications
Anus-praeter complications. Dissertation. Erlangen / Nuremberg 1987 with Ortwin Beisbart (ed.): Memorial Book of the Jewish citizens of Bamberg. Victims of Nazi terror 1933–1945. White, Bamberg 2008, 
My covenant, which ye shall keep it. Religious Legal and medical aspects of circumcision. Herder, Freiburg / Basel / Wien, 2012,

See also
Timeline of women rabbis

References

External links
Article about Antje Yael Deusel on evangelisch.de
Israelitische Kultusgemeinde in Bamberg
Beitrag auf KircheinBayern.de
Biographie auf ARK Allgemeine Rabinerkonferenz
Jewish community in Bamberg

1960 births
21st-century German rabbis
German Reform rabbis
Living people
Place of birth missing (living people)
Reform women rabbis